The Alatac was an automobile built by Automobiles Catala of Braine-le-Comte, Belgium, from 1913 to 1914. 

The company had its HQ in the Rue Ten Bosch in Brussels and its manufacturing plants in Braine le Comte.
Production ended in 1914 with the invasion of Belgium and the escalation of World War I.

Two models were made, one being a 9/12CV and the other 12/16CV, both having four cylinder, sidevalve Chapuis-Dornier monobloc engines. 

They had a conventional Malicet & Blin chassis, an attractive V-radiator, and detachable wire wheels.

Etienne Catala took part in the 1914 Rally d' Ostende in one of his firm's cars.

References
Georgano, G.N., "Alatac", in G.N. Georgano, ed., The Complete Encyclopedia of Motorcars 1885-1968  (New York: E.P. Dutton and Co., 1974), pp.31.

Vintage vehicles
Defunct motor vehicle manufacturers of Belgium